David Mayhew may refer to:

David R. Mayhew (born 1937), American political scientist and Yale professor
David Mayhew (banker) (born 1940), British banker
David Mayhew (racing driver) (born 1982), American stock car racing driver